The 2007 Speedway Grand Prix of Czech Republic was the sixth race of the 2007 Speedway Grand Prix season. It took place on 28 July in the Marketa Stadium in Prague, Czech Republic.

Starting positions draw 

(12) Bjarne Pedersen (Denmark)
(16) Luboš Tomíček, Jr. (Czech Republic)
(9) Jarosław Hampel (Poland)
(10) Antonio Lindbäck (Sweden)
(15) Chris Harris (United Kingdom)
(2) Greg Hancock (United States)
(3) Nicki Pedersen (Denmark)
(13) Wiesław Jaguś (Poland)
(11) Scott Nicholls (United Kingdom)
(7) Matej Žagar (Slovenia)
(14) Rune Holta (Poland)
(5) Leigh Adams (Australia)
(1) Jason Crump (Australia)
(8) Tomasz Gollob (Poland)
(4) Andreas Jonsson (Sweden)
(6) Hans N. Andersen (Denmark)
(17) Josef Franc (Czech Republic)
(18) Matěj Kůs (Czech Republic)

Heat details

Heat after heat 
 B.Pedersen, Tomíček, Hampel, Lindbäck
 N.Pedersen, Harris, Jaguś, Hancock
 Žagar, Adams, Holta, Nicholls
 Jonsson, Andersen, Crump, Gollob
 Nicholls, Crump, B.Pedersen, Harris
 Žagar, Hancock, Tomíček, Gollob
 N.Pedersen, Holta, Jonsson, Hampel
 Jaguś, Adams, Andersen, Lindbäck
 Holta, Andersen, Hancock, B.Pedersen
 Jonsson, Adams, Harris, Tomíček
 Hampel, Nicholls, Jaguś, Gollob (e)
 N.Pedersen, Crump, Žagar, Lindbäck (e)
 N.Pedersen, Adams, Gollob, B.Pedersen
 Crump, Holta, Tomíček, Jaguś
 Hampel, Andersen, Harris, Žagar
 Nicholls, Hancock, Franc, Jonsson (Fx)
 Jaguś, B.Pedersen, Žagar, Kůs
 N.Pedersen, Nicholls, Andersen, Tomíček
 Hampel, Crump, Hancock, Adams
 Holta, Franc, Harris, Gollob
Semi-Finals:
 N.Pedersen, Nicholls, Jaguś, Žagar
 Holta, Hampel, Crump, Adams
The Final:
 N.Pedersen (6 points), Hampel (4 pts), Holta (2 pts), Nicholls

The intermediate classification

See also 
 List of Speedway Grand Prix riders

References 

C
2007